The California State Auditor's Office (CSA), formerly known as the Office of the Auditor General and later the Bureau of State Audits (BSA), is the supreme audit institution of the Government of California. It is headed by the State Auditor who is appointed by the Governor to a 4-year term from a list of 3 qualified individuals submitted by the Joint Legislative Audit Committee of the California State Legislature.

California law requires the bureau to examine and report annually upon the financial statements prepared by the executive branch of the state; perform other related assignments, including performance audits, that are mandated by statute; administer the Reporting of Improper Governmental Activities Act; and conduct audits and investigations of public entities requested by the Joint Legislative Audit Committee to the extent that funding is available.

The auditors investigate whistleblower complaints against state agencies and provides the report to the governor and legislature. The agencies have 60 days to report on any disciplinary and corrective actions they take.

The CSA also helps implement the Citizens Redistricting Commission per California Proposition 11 (2008) and California Proposition 20 (2010).

Although the bureau is located within the executive branch, state law grants the CSA independence from executive branch oversight. The bureau is overseen by the Little Hoover Commission, an independent state oversight agency.

References

External links
 Official website
Joint Legislative Audit Committee
Office of the Auditor General - Past Reports

Auditor
Government agencies established in 1993
1993 establishments in California
State auditors and comptrollers of the United States